The 2017 Singapore League Cup (known as The New Paper League Cup for sponsorship reasons) is the 11th edition of the Singapore League Cup, Singapore's premier club football tournament organised by the Football Association of Singapore. Albirex Niigata (S) are the defending champions, having won their third trophy the previous year. The tournament was held from 7 to 21 July 2017.

Teams

A total of 8 teams participate in the 2017 Singapore League Cup with all clubs coming from the S.League. Young Lions will not be participating in this edition of the Singapore League Cup.

  Albirex Niigata (S)
 Balestier Khalsa
  DPMM FC
 Geylang International
 Home United
 Hougang United
 Tampines Rovers
 Warriors FC

Group stage

Group A

Group B

Knockout phase

Bracket

Semi-finals

Final

Statistics

Scorers

Own goals

Winners

See also
 S.League
 Singapore FA Cup
 Singapore Cup
 Singapore Community Shield
 Football Association of Singapore
 List of football clubs in Singapore

References

2017
League Cup
2017 Asian domestic association football cups
July 2017 sports events in Asia